Nifenalol is a beta-adrenoceptor antagonist.

References

Beta blockers
Nitrobenzenes
Phenylethanolamines
Isopropylamino compounds
Secondary amines